Maria Voce (born 16 July 1937) is an Italian lawyer and former president of the Focolare Movement. She was born in Calabria, Italy. She was elected as the president by the General Assembly of the Movement after the death of its founder Chiara Lubich, in March 2008.

Career 

Maria Voce joined the Movement in 1959 and for 44 years she lived in the Focolare community. After graduating from law, she also completed studies of theology and canon law; in recent years she has been involved in the recent update of the General Acts of the Movement. It is among the leaders of "Communion and Law", a network of professionals and scholars engaged in justice, recently born in the Focolare. She is also a member of Abba School, Interdisciplinary Studies Center. She has also gained a direct experience in ecumenical and interreligious fields; having lived in Turkey for ten years. From 1978 to 1988, she had close ties with the Patriarchate of Constantinople (also with the present Patriarch Bartholomew I), with leaders of other Christian Churches, and with the Muslim world. she was elected as president by the General Assembly of the Movement after the death of the founder Chiara Lubich, on 14 March 2008. She was re-elected on 12 September 2014 for a six-year term.

On 7 December 2009, Pope Benedict XVI appointed Voce as Consultor to the Pontifical Council for the Laity. In 2014, Voce received an honorary degree in laws from the University of Notre Dame for her ecumenical work as well as work with the laity.

References 

1937 births
Living people
People from the Province of Cosenza
20th-century Italian lawyers
Italian women lawyers
20th-century women lawyers